Blended is a 2014 American romantic comedy film directed by Frank Coraci and distributed by Warner Bros. Written by Ivan Menchell and Clare Sera, the film stars Adam Sandler and Drew Barrymore as two single parents who went on a blind date together and never wanted to see each other again afterwards. To their surprise, they both end up at the same African safari resort with their children and are forced to stay together. The film's ensemble cast also features Bella Thorne, Emma Fuhrmann, Terry Crews, Joel McHale, Wendi McLendon-Covey, Kevin Nealon, and Shaquille O'Neal. South African cricketer Dale Steyn makes a cameo appearance as himself.

The film was produced by Adam Sandler, Jack Giarraputo, and Mike Karz and was released on May 23, 2014. It grossed $14.3 million during its opening weekend and $128 million worldwide, against a budget of $40 million, and received generally negative reviews from critics. This is the third collaboration between Sandler and Barrymore after The Wedding Singer (also directed by Coraci) and 50 First Dates.

Plot
Divorced Lauren Reynolds goes on a blind date with widower Jim Friedman at Hooters; it goes poorly. Lauren and Jim run into each other while on errands to the pharmacy, and the cashier mistakenly switches their credit cards. Jim goes to Lauren's house to switch the credit cards back. Jen is at Lauren's house and has broken up with her boyfriend Dick, Jim's boss, although she and Dick had already paid for a trip to Africa. Lauren commits to using Jen's portion of the vacation package without knowing that Jim intends to use Dick's as well and that the hotel accommodation is for a romantic suite.

The families are put together for a "blended familymoon", where they get together with other couples, including the oversexed Eddy and Ginger. Eddy's new bride is quite his junior, to the chagrin of their teenage son Jake, on whom Jim's oldest daughter Hilary develops a crush at first sight. The kids make an awkward impression with each other, with Brendan calling his mother "hot," and the others not knowing how to react to Espen acting like her mother is there with her, as she is not ready to let go of her yet. Over time the kids begin to bond with each other and each other's parent.

Jim bonds with the boys, helping them with adventurous sports, while Lauren bonds with the girls, helping Hilary to change her tomboyish look into a more feminine one, leading to Jake becoming her boyfriend. As they become closer to their children, Jim and Lauren begin to warm up to each other. They inadvertently get together for a couples' massage and have fun with each other. When Lou asks Lauren to put her to bed, Lauren sings her "Over the Rainbow," which, unknown to her, was the song Lou's mother used to sing. The other girls pretend to sleep, while discovering how much they truly love Lauren. She returns this feeling when she maternally kisses each girl's forehead as she says goodnight. Jim starts to experience deeper feelings for Lauren.

On the last night of the trip, Lauren puts on a black dress that she admired earlier. She wears it that evening and receives admiration from everyone. Jim and Lauren are sat down for a romantic dinner, which Lauren soon discovers was actually planned by Jim specifically for her. They chat briefly about basic parenting techniques and then pull in for a kiss; however, at the last second, Jim pulls away, apologizing and explaining that he "can't do it".

After returning to America, Jim realizes he misses Lauren and that he has fallen in love with her, which he admits to his daughters who are ecstatic with the news. Although Espen is not fully ready to move on from her mother's death, she also does not want her family to lose Lauren. She tells her father that her mother said that she had other things to do in Heaven, and would not be around as much. At the kids' behest, Jim goes to Lauren's house to give her flowers, only to find her ex-husband Mark there. Tyler gets excited to see Jim and wants to play ball; Mark bullies Jim into leaving, then ditches Tyler to answer a summons from work. Mark tries to make a move on Lauren, but she refuses his advances because of his continuous failure to be a good father, in addition to his having an affair during their marriage.

Lauren and Brendan go to support Tyler at his next baseball game, along with Jen and Dick, whom Jen has worked things out with, and his five kids. Mark does not come to the game. Jim and his daughters arrive to show encouragement, inspiring Tyler to hit the ball as Jim had taught him in Africa. Jim then finds Lauren and they admit to wanting to be together, and they kiss, to the happiness of their kids, who know that they are already a blended family.

Cast 

In addition, Shaquille O'Neal appears as Doug; Dan Patrick, longtime anchor of ESPN's SportsCenter, appears as Dick; South African cricketer Dale Steyn plays himself; Lauren Lapkus appears as Tracy the babysitter; Mary Pat Gleason appears as a pharmacy cashier; Allen Covert and Alexis Arquette make cameo appearances reprising their roles as Ten Second Tom and Georgina from 50 First Dates and The Wedding Singer, respectively. Sandler's mother, wife, and daughters, Judith, Jacqueline, Sunny, and Sadie Sandler, appear in the film.

Production
Wendi McLendon-Covey joined the cast of the film on July 31, 2013; she played Barrymore's character's best friend, who does not have any children. Chelsea Handler was previously cast in this role. On July 31, 2013, Warner Bros. changed the title from Blended to The Familymoon, before reverting to its original title later that year.

Filming
Principal photography for Blended took place at the Sun City resort in South Africa. Some scenes were filmed near Lake Lanier, Buford, and Gainesville in Georgia, USA. Warner Bros. Pictures co-produced the film with Happy Madison Productions.

Reception
The film was distributed by Warner Bros., and released theatrically on May 23, 2014.

Critical response
On Rotten Tomatoes, the film has an approval rating of 15% based on 140 reviews with an average rating of 4.10/10. The site's critical consensus reads, "Lurching between slapstick and schmaltz without showing much of a commitment to either, Blended commits the rare Sandler sin of provoking little more than boredom." On Metacritic, the film has a score of 31 out of 100 based on reviews from 33 critics, indicating "generally unfavorable reviews". Audiences polled by CinemaScore gave the film an average grade of "A−" on an A+ to F scale.

A. O. Scott, of The New York Times, complained about the film's "retrograde gender politics; its delight in the humiliation of children; its sentimental hypocrisy about male behavior; its quasi-zoological depiction of Africans as servile, dancing, drum-playing simpletons" and concluded "Parents strongly cautioned. It will make your children stupid." Andrew Barker of Variety criticized the film for not trusting its audience "following every unexpectedly smart exchange with a numbskull pratfall or one-liner, and every instance of genuine sincerity with an avalanche of schmaltz." Sheri Linden of The Hollywood Reporter called the film a wholesome family drama, and compared it to the 2005 film Yours, Mine and Ours. Linden praised the lead performances saying "Sandler and Barrymore display an onscreen connection that lends a grounding warmth to the clunkiest comedy setups" and welcomed the interruption by Terry Crews character, although "Like all routines in the film, though, it repeats itself rather than venture into fresher and funnier territory." In summary "This hit-and-miss comedy feels caught between old-school nostalgia and movie-persona growing pains on the part of Adam Sandler." Christy Lemire gave the movie 1.5 stars and stated that while this wasn't Sandler's best performance, "That actor is in there, somewhere. Perhaps Sandler will actually challenge himself again one of these days and set him free." The Nationals Jocelyn Noveck said, "To say that the new Adam Sandler movie is better than some of his other recent work isn’t saying much" and gave the movie a single star. Hitfix declared Blended is "[Not] Adam Sandler's Worst [film]!"

Gary Goldstein of the Los Angeles Times gave the film a positive review and wrote: "It could have been a bit smarter and a lot shorter, but Blended, the third big-screen pairing for Adam Sandler and Drew Barrymore (after The Wedding Singer and 50 First Dates), is a fun, often funny, largely enjoyable romp."
Defending the film for its strong family values, Graham Young of the Birmingham Mail wrote, "It's warm, funny, tender, serious and, despite a couple of teenage references, decidedly old fashioned. There’s no swearing, no pandering to repeated toilet gags and the ‘gross-out’ market is all but ignored. Instead, there's lots of genuinely funny slapstick, singing asides and some great kids’ performances."

Box office
The film performed poorly at the box office; analysts had predicted an opening weekend gross of $30 million but the film grossed just $14.2 million.
It finished third at the box office behind X-Men: Days of Future Past and Godzilla. According to Warner Bros., the audience was 56% female and 74% over the age of 25, which indicates that families were not a big part of the opening weekend audience.
Cinema Blend called it "one of Adam Sandler's Worst-Ever Openings" comparing it to 50 First Dates which opened to $40 million ten years previously. Dan Fellman Warner Bros.' president of domestic distribution attributed the weak opening to good weather over Memorial Day weekend, but was optimistic based on the A− grade from CinemaScore. Box Office Mojo said it was likely to earn over $50 million.

The film had grossed $46,219,290 in North America and $81,800,000 in other territories for a total worldwide gross of $128 million.

Accolades

Home media
Blended was released on DVD and Blu-ray on August 26, 2014. It sold $14,808,893 in DVD sales and $5,619,798 in Blu-ray sales, for a total of $20,428,691.

References

External links
 
 
 

2014 films
2014 romantic comedy films
American romantic comedy films
Comedy crossover films
Dune Entertainment films
2010s English-language films
Films directed by Frank Coraci
Films about vacationing
Films set in Africa
Films shot in Georgia (U.S. state)
Films shot in South Africa
Happy Madison Productions films
Warner Bros. films
Gulfstream Pictures films
Films produced by Adam Sandler
Films produced by Jack Giarraputo
Films scored by Rupert Gregson-Williams
Films set in Connecticut
2010s American films